Two ships of the United States Navy have borne the name USS Gudgeon, named in honor of the gudgeon.

 was a  submarine, commissioned in 1952, sold to Turkey and stricken from the Naval Vessel Register in 1987. As TCG Hizir Reis (S-342), the sub served in the Turkish Navy from 1983 to 2004

United States Navy ship names